Knower, also stylized as KNOWER, is an American independent electronic music duo who have gained success releasing music online. The group consists of Louis Cole and Genevieve Artadi. Their full band is a jazz-funk act that includes saxophone, bass and keyboard players.

Background
Louis Cole studied music in Los Angeles, California, graduating from the Jazz Studies program at USC Thornton in 2009. He became good friends with fellow musician Jack Conte in 2006. Both composed and recorded some songs which are present on Conte's YouTube channel. Conte suggested Cole start releasing his music online. 

Genevieve Artadi also studied music in Los Angeles. She received her Bachelors in Jazz Studies at California State University (CSU) Northridge and did post-graduate studies at CSU Long Beach. 

Louis Cole met Genevieve Artadi through the LA-based saxophonist Robby Marshall. In 2009 Cole and Artadi joined forces. They released their first album in 2010. In addition, they maintain their own respective channels, often collaborating on each other's solo releases.

Career
In early 2010, the group began to upload their music to YouTube. Their first video, a cover of Britney Spears's song "3" got a lot of hits quickly thanks to Jack Conte promoting it on YouTube. Another early video release, "Window Shop" (originally recorded on Louis Cole's first album) also got a lot of hits thanks to a front page YouTube feature. In this same year, they released their debut album, Louis Cole and Genevieve Artadi.

In 2011, their second album Think Thoughts was released. Songs such as "Around" and "I Remember" presented some heavy funk grooves. Soon after the release of this album, the group collaborated with Pomplamoose to release a single, "It Goes On." Sporting the group's distinctive electro-funk sound, the single brought increased visibility to the duo.

Let Go, Knower's third album, was released in 2013. They followed the release of Let Go with a performance at Bonnaroo Festival with Soul Khan, Jenny Suk, and Black Violin. Knower also went on a tour of the east coast United States with duo WeYou, consisting of Nate Wood and Jesske Hume.

In 2014, Knower released the non-album single "I Must Be Dreaming", and toured the East Coast and the South. They were also presented by Quincy Jones in a new artist concert series in Los Angeles. Their song "Fuck the Makeup, Skip the Shower" was featured on FlyLo FM (hosted by Flying Lotus) on the next-gen version of Grand Theft Auto V.

In 2015, Knower recorded with Snarky Puppy on their Family Dinner – Volume 2.

In 2016 they formed a 5-piece live band as an alternative lineup. Apart from the core members, the band at various points included Tim Lefebvre, Dennis Hamm, Sam Wilkes, Sam Gendel, Nate Wood and Jonah Nilsson. Their European tour of 2016, as well as parts of the US tour, featured the live band.

In July 2017, Knower opened for the Red Hot Chili Peppers in four major European cities. In 2018, Knower toured Europe, China, Japan, and the US, continuing the live band formation and also unveiling a renovated duo set with Artadi and Cole. In 2019, Knower expanded their touring to South Africa and South America, including Rapa Nui.

Since 2017, Knower has performed in multiple European cities with the Swedish big band Norrbotten Big Band.

In 2020, during the COVID-19 pandemic, the pair released a "living room power set" onto their YouTube Channel, which included live performances of "Overtime", "Time Traveller", "PIZZA", and "It's Time", among other songs.

Members
Permanent members
 Genevieve Artadi — vocals, composer/songwriter, keyboards, bass guitar (2009–present)
 Louis Cole — multi instrumentalist, percussion, keyboards, vocals, strings, choral conducting (2009–present)
Members of full band, guests or former members
 Tim Lefebvre — bass
 Sam Wilkes — bass
 Petter Olofsson — bass
 Sam Gendel — saxophone
 David Binney — saxophone
 John Escreet — piano
 Vikram Devasthali — raps
 Aya Toyoshima — trombone
 Jack Conte — keyboard, drums
 Nataly Dawn — bass, vocals
 Adam Ratner — guitar
 Rai Thistlethwayte — keyboard
 Dennis Hamm — keyboard
 Jacob Mann — keyboard
 Thom Gill — guitar, vocals
 Jonah Nilsson — keyboard
 Nicholas Semrad — keyboard

Discography

Studio albums

Singles

Music videos

References

External links

Musical groups established in 2009
Musical groups from Los Angeles
Musical groups from California
American musical duos
Jazz fusion ensembles
Electronic music duos